D. Moor was the professional name of Dmitry Stakhievich Orlov (3 November 1883 in Novocherkassk; † 24 October 1946 in Moscow), a Russian artist noted for his propaganda posters. The pseudonym "Moor" was taken from the name of the protagonists in Friedrich Schiller's play The Robbers.

He was also the chief artist for the Bezbozhnik ("Godless") magazine.

See also
 List of Soviet poster artists

References

External links
  Lambiek Comiclopedia article.

1883 births
1946 deaths
People from Novocherkassk
People from Don Host Oblast
Russian poster artists
Russian illustrators
Russian comics artists
20th-century Russian painters
Russian male painters
Postcard artists
20th-century Russian male artists